Womble is a surname. Notable people with the surname include:

David Womble (born 1977), English cricketer
Larry W. Womble (1941–2020), American politician
Royce Womble (1931–2016), American football player
Trevor Womble (born 1951), English footballer
Warren Womble (1920–2015), American basketball coach